Lusaka Province is one of the ten provinces of Zambia. Its capital is Lusaka, which is also the national capital.  It is the smallest province in Zambia, with an area of 21,896 km2. Lusaka is also Zambia's most populated and most densely populated province, with a population of 2,191,225 and density of 100 persons per km2 as of 2010. It is the most urban province, with the most doctors and fewest malaria-related incidents. The province is bordered by Zimbabwe and Mozambique, and separated by the Lower Zambezi National Park.

The Lower Zambezi National Park, part of the Lunsemfwa River valley, the lower Luangwa Valley in the north-east and the Kafue Flats in the south-west are the major national parks and game areas in Lusaka Province. In Lusaka, the Nkhombalyanga festival is celebrated in Chongwe District by the Soli tribe during July, the Dantho festival is celebrated in Luangwa District by the Chikunda tribe during September and the Chakwela Makumbi festival celebrated in Chongwe District by Soli tribe during September.

There are six districts in the province. As of 2004, the literacy rate was 83% while the unemployment rate was 31%. The general unemployment rate for youth was 52% as of 2008. Kenneth Kaunda International Airport (belonging to Lusaka, although part of Chongwe District) and Lusaka City Airport (in Lusaka) are the two airports in the province.

Geography

Lusaka Province is bordered along Zimbabwe along Lower Zambezi National Park in the south, Central Province in the north, Southern Province in the southwest and Eastern Province in the north east. The general topography of the province is characterized by uplifted planation surfaces. The general elevation of the nation as a whole is tended towards West to East from the Kalahari Basin. The level of land falls from the upper Congo towards the Zambezi depression in the South forming a plateau.

Kafue River is a tributary of Zambezi River and it has huge valleys breaking the plateau. The province lies in the watershed between Congo DR and Zambezi river systems. The province lies in the frontier formed between the continental divide separating the Atlantic Ocean and the Indian Ocean, which traverses from DR Congo to the south of Tanzania. There are three major seasons: a cool dry season from April to August, a hot dry season from August to November and a warm wet season from November to April. The maximum heat and rainfall, both are experienced during October. The annual rainfall is less than 750 mm in the region.

Demography 
As per 2010 Zambian Census, Lusaka's population was 2,238,569, making it the most populated province. The majority of this population is concentrated in its smallest district, which is Lusaka District, with its population of  1,747,152 at the 2010 Census (current projection in 2019 is 2,627,716) or 79% of the province's total, with a population density of 4,180.8 people per km2.

The province has the population highest growth rate, with an average of 4.6%, compared to the national growth rate of 2.8%. In 2000, it was the second most populated province from the Copperbelt province, with a population of 1,391,329. However, as of the previous census growth rate, Lusaka had surpassed the Copperbelt as the most populated province.

Population of Districts 

A compilation of districts of Lusaka with their respective populations source of information in data 

As of 2011, the President of Zambia, the late Michael Sata, made Chilanga its own district (A separate district from Lusaka, The Capital City Of Zambia). Chilanga covers a small area separating Lusaka and Kafue along the Great North Road as well as a large area to the west of Lusaka Central before Shibuyunji District, making Chilanga District larger than Lusaka (also making Lusaka the smallest district in area, albeit with the largest population).

As Of 2018, the President of Zambia, Edgar Lungu, moved Shibuyunji district from Lusaka province to Central Province as part of a development plan for the area. 

Excluding Shibuyunji District (officially now part of Central Province), Lusaka Province has 7 districts as of March 2018.

Ethnicity 
Lusaka is an ethnically diverse province and is the only province in Zambia without a single ethnic group making up a third of the Population. The Bemba form the largest ethnicity at 20.2%, while the largest ethnic cluster is the Nyanja cluster (comprising Chewa, Nsenga, Chikunda, Kunda and Ngoni) making up 30.5%. The native Soil, Goba and Chikunda people only markup 0.8%,0.6% and 1.2% respectively. Other natives are the Nsenga Luzi (of Luangwa District)).

There is also a considerable presence of Europeans, Asians and other African nationalities.

Languages 
The most spoken language in Lusaka is ciNyanja, a language that exhibits the melting pot that the Province has become. ciNyanja is a lingua franca which is close to ciChewa, ChiNsenga, other languages of Eastern Province  and notable influence from Nguni languages. The contemporary Lusaka Nyanja has incorporated a lot of borrowed words from English and other languages, due to the massive influx of people from the entire Southern and Central African region.

Bemba is another language that is common, Tonga is spoken in pockets of the province. While English was the fastest growing language between 2000 and 2010. There is no clear distinction between dialects and languages in mainstream Zambia. Therefore, languages in the diagrams below will be grouped and listed individually.

National Parks and culture

The Lower Zambezi National Park, parts of the Lunsemfwa River valley and the lower Luangwa Valley in the north-east and part of the Kafue Flats in the south-west are the major National parks and game area in Lusaka Province. The Nkhombalyanga festival celebrated in Chongwe District by Soli tribe during July, Dantho festival celebrated in Luangwa District by Chikunda tribe during September, Chakwela Makumbi festival celebrated in Chongwe District by Soli tribe during September, Mbambara festival celebrated in Luangwa District by Nsenga Luzi tribe during November, Chibwela Kumushi festival celebrated in Luangwa District by Soli tribe during November, Kailala festival celebrated in Kafue District by Goba tribe during November and Chibwela Kumushi festival celebrated in Luangwa District by Soli tribe during November are the major festivals celebrated in the Province.

Administration

Provincial administration is set up purely for administrative purposes. The province is headed by a minister appointed by the President, and there are ministries of central government for each province. The administrative head of the province is the Permanent Secretary, appointed by the President. There is a Deputy Permanent Secretary, heads of government departments and civil servants at the provincial level. Lusaka Province is divided into six districts, namely, Chilanga District, Chongwe District, Kafue District, Luangwa District, Lusaka District and Rufunsa District. All the district headquarters are the same as the district names. There are six councils in the province, each of which is headed by an elected representative, called a councilor. Each councilor holds office for three years. The administrative staff of the council is selected by a Local Government Service Commission from within or outside the district. The office of the provincial government is located in each of the district headquarters and has provincial local government officers and auditors. Each council is responsible for raising and collecting local taxes and the budgets of the council are audited and submitted every year after the annual budget. The elected members of the council do not draw salaries, but are paid allowances by the council. Lusaka is a province and Zambia's capital city is also Lusaka with one city council. The government stipulates 63 different functions for the councils, with the majority of them being infrastructure management and local administration. Councils are mandated to maintain each of their community centres, zoos, local parks, drainage system, playgrounds, cemeteries, caravan sites, libraries, museums and art galleries. They also work along with specific government departments to help with agriculture, conservation of natural resources, postal services, and establishing and maintaining hospitals, schools and colleges. The councils prepare schemes that encourage community participation.

Economy and education

The unemployment rate was 31%, and the general unemployment rate for youth was 52% as of 2008. The province had 231 doctors as of 2005. There were 313 Malaria incidence for every 1,000 people in the province as of 2005 and there were 15,429 AIDS death as of 2010.

The total area of crops planted during the year 2014 in the province was 82,603.72 hectares, which constituted  4.35% of the total area cultivated in Zambia. The net production stood at 234,807 metric tonnes, which formed 5.76% of the total agricultural production in the country. Wheat was the major crop in the province with 48,510 metric tonnes, constituting 24.07% of the national output. Kenneth Kaunda International Airport and Lusaka City Airport are the two airports in the province.

Notes

References

External links

 
Provinces of Zambia